Samuel Moore (born March 16, 2001) is an American professional soccer player who plays as a defender for North Carolina Tar Heels.

Career

Youth
Moore playing with Richmond United from 2014, before signing for USL League One side Richmond Kickers on March 20, 2019, on an academy contract to preserve his college eligibility.

College
Moore began playing college soccer at the University of North Carolina at Chapel Hill in 2019.

References

2001 births
Living people
American soccer players
Association football defenders
Richmond Kickers players
North Carolina Tar Heels men's soccer players
Soccer players from Virginia
USL League One players